USS Sioux may refer to:

 , an iron-hulled tugboat built as P. H. Wise at Philadelphia in 1892
 , a cargo ship built in 1916 by the American Shipbuilding Co., Cleveland, Ohio
 , a  fleet tug in service from World War II through the Vietnam War
 , a  fleet ocean tug placed in service in 1981

See also
 

United States Navy ship names